Coleophora hyssopi is a moth of the family Coleophoridae. It is found in southern France and Spain.

The larvae feed on Hyssopus officinalis. They create a case. Cases can be found in early June.

References

hyssopi
Moths described in 1961
Moths of Europe